Tanaoctenia haliaria is a species of moth of the family Geometridae first described by Francis Walker in 1861. It is found in Taiwan, Nepal, China (Xizang), north-eastern India and Myanmar.

The wingspan is 31–45 mm.

References

Moths described in 1861
Ennominae